Phanourios may refer to:

Phanourios (saint), an Eastern Orthodox saint
Cyprus Dwarf Hippopotamus